This table displays the top-rated primetime television series of the 2003–04 season as measured by Nielsen Media Research.

References

2003 in American television
2004 in American television
2003-related lists
2004-related lists
Lists of American television series